IFN of IfN may mean
 Interferon, a type of signaling proteins
 Information Fuzzy Networks, a machine learning algorithm
 Integrated Flux Nebula, a cloud of gas and dust illuminated by the integrated flux of all the stars in the Milky Way (rather than a single star or group of stars). 
 Leibniz Institute for Neurobiology (Leibniz-Institut für Neurobiologie), Germany
 India Fund, Inc., a mutual fund
 Isfahan International Airport (IATA code)
 Institutet för Näringslivsforskning, Research Institute for Industrial Economics, Sweden
 Instituto di Fotonica e Nanotecnologie, Institute for Photonics and Nanotechnologies, Trento, Italy